"In Terms of Love" is a song written by Kristyn Osborn and Don Schlitz, and recorded by American country music group SHeDAISY. It was released in May 2006 as the second single from the album Fortuneteller's Melody, and reached a peak of number 32 on the Billboard Hot Country Songs chart. It was the final single release of SHeDAISY's career.

Chart performance

References

2006 singles
2005 songs
SHeDAISY songs
Songs written by Kristyn Osborn
Songs written by Don Schlitz
Song recordings produced by John Shanks
Lyric Street Records singles